Route 515 is the main road in Bakwa District in Afghanistan.  It is a compact gravel road that travels east–west and connects Delaram on the east terminus with Farah City on the west terminus.  The road is about 75 kilometers long and about 38 kilometers from Delaram to the Bakwa District Center.

Route
The Delaram end of the road starts at Highway 1 or Ring Road.  The route intersects with Route 606 near Delaram and passes through the Bakwa District Center.

Key points
East terminus (Delaram at Highway 1): 
Intersection with Route 606: 
Bakwa District Center: 
West terminus (Farah City):

History
In 2009, it was under major improvement by an Afghan contracting company and was expected to be completed in June 2010.

Notes

Farah Province
Nimruz Province
Roads in Afghanistan
Gravel roads